The 1969 Kent State Golden Flashes football team was an American football team that represented Kent State University in the Mid-American Conference (MAC) during the 1969 NCAA University Division football season. In their second season under head coach Dave Puddington, the Golden Flashes compiled a 5–5 record (1–4 against MAC opponents), finished in sixth place in the MAC, and were outscored by all opponents by a combined total of 198 to 166. The 1969 season also marked the team's first year in the new Memorial Stadium, later named Dix Stadium. The stadium opened September 13 with a win over the Dayton Flyers, though was not fully completed until 1970.

The team's statistical leaders included Don Nottingham with 990 rushing yards, Steve Trustdorf with 442 passing yards, and Bob Fello with 222 receiving yards. Three Kent State players were selected as first-team All-MAC players: center Fred Blosser, linebacker Jim Corrigall, and running back Don Nottingham.

Schedule

References

Kent State
Kent State Golden Flashes football seasons
Kent State Golden Flashes football